Dom Dom or Domdom may refer to:

 Dom Dom, a Japanese fast food restaurant
 Mount Dom Dom, Victoria, Australia
 Dum Dum, known in Bengali as Dômdôm, a populated municipality near north Kolkata, India
 Dimdim Castle, known in Persian as Domdom, a Kurdish fortress in Iran
 Domdoms, fictional creatures in the 1986 arcade game Toy Pop

See also 
 Dondon (disambiguation)